Green Gartside (born Paul Julian Strohmeyer; 22 June 1955) is a Welsh songwriter, singer and musician. He is the frontman of the band Scritti Politti.

Early life
Gartside was born on 22 June 1955 in Cardiff, Wales, to a "Cup-a-Soup salesman dad and a hairdresser/secretary/whatever mum". His childhood was not always happy, with the family, which included a sister, having to move every twelve months or so because of his father's job. He ended up "living all over [Wales], from Bridgend to Newport to Ystrad Mynach". His father died while he was a child, after which his widowed mother married her boss, a solicitor from Newport named Gordon Gartside, from whom he adopted his new surname. Gartside recalls, "The 'Green' bit came about because I didn’t like the fact there were two other Pauls in my class and I wanted something different. So I just chose something random after listening to a Captain Beefheart album where all the musicians were named odd things like Zoot Horn Rollo. I thought having a made-up name was well cool".

Gartside attended Croesyceiliog Grammar School in Cwmbran (now known as Croesyceiliog School). At 14 he formed a branch of the Young Communist League, along with his schoolfriend and future Scritti Politti bassist Nial Jinks. He later completed a foundation course in art at Newport Art College (now known as the Faculty of Creative Industries at the University of South Wales) and formed a band called Heads of the Valleys.

In the mid-1970s, Gartside moved to England to study fine art at Leeds Polytechnic.

Career
While at art school in Leeds in 1977, Gartside formed the post-punk band Scritti Politti with schoolmate and friend Nial Jinks and art school friend Tom Morley. After Gartside and Morley had left Leeds Polytechnic, they moved to London, later securing a recording deal with Rough Trade Records who released the first Scritti Politti studio album Songs to Remember in 1982. However, subsequent Scritti Politti studio albums featured Gartside with different personnel, with Gartside being the only constant member of the group. In 1983, Gartside provided guest vocals on Eurythmics's cover version of the Sam & Dave song "Wrap It Up" from their studio album Sweet Dreams (Are Made of This).

As Scritti Politti, Gartside and New York keyboardist David Gamson and American drummer Fred Maher released the studio album Cupid & Psyche 85 in June 1985. The album included hits "Wood Beez (Pray Like Aretha Franklin)" (to the video for which Michael Clark lent his contemporary dance); "Absolute" (the video being based on William Shakespeare's A Midsummer Night's Dream); "The Word Girl"; "Perfect Way"; and "Hypnotize". Released on Virgin Records it reached number 5 in the UK and was certified Gold by the BPI for 100,000 copies sold. It was produced by Scritti Politti and Turkish-born Arif Mardin who coincidentally also produced Aretha Franklin, one of Gartside's musical influences.

In 1988 Scritti Politti's studio album Provision was a UK Top 10 success, though it only produced one UK Top 20 hit single, "Oh Patti". After releasing a couple of non-album singles in 1991, as well as a collaboration with B.E.F., Gartside became disillusioned with the music industry and retired to South Wales for more than seven years.

In the early and mid 1990s, Gartside lived alone in a secluded cottage in Usk, Monmouthshire, spending his time listening to hip hop, playing darts and drinking beer at his local pub. He returned to music-making in the late 1990s, releasing a new studio album, Anomie & Bonhomie, in 1999 (which included various rap and hip hop influences).

In 2006, another new studio album was released by Gartside, the stripped-down White Bread Black Beer by Scritti Politti, which returned to the more experimental era of the band's history. He also returned to touring, including his first ever tour of the United States with his band Scritti Politti.

In 2012, Gartside, who has suffered from recurring stage fright that prevented Scritti Politti from touring for many years, performed several songs by Sandy Denny of Fairport Convention as part of a tribute called The Lady in several UK cities.

In 2015, Gartside was awarded an Honourary Fellowship from Goldsmiths, University of London.

He has been a regular stand-in presenter on BBC Radio 6 Music.

Gartside has also worked with Miles Davis, Chaka Khan, Eurythmics, Elvis Costello, Shabba Ranks, Mos Def, Meshell Ndegeocello, Kylie Minogue, Robyn Hitchcock, Manic Street Preachers, Tracey Thorn, and Robert Wyatt (on Songs to Remember).

In 2020, Gartside released a solo single on Rough Trade Records, which featured covers of "Tangled Man" and "Wishing Well" by folk singer Anne Briggs.

See also
 List of Welsh musicians

References

External links
 
 Green Gartside/Scritti Politti biography at AllMusic
 
 
 

1955 births
Living people
British songwriters
British male singers
Welsh songwriters
Welsh male singers
Welsh communists
Welsh socialists
Musicians from Cardiff
People from Cwmbran
Welsh people of German descent
Scritti Politti members
Alumni of the University of Wales, Newport
Alumni of Leeds Beckett University
People educated at Croesyceiliog Grammar School
Welsh new wave musicians
Communist Party of Great Britain members
Young Communist League of Britain members
British male songwriters